Ekshärad is a locality in Hagfors Municipality, Värmland County, Sweden with 1,074 inhabitants in 2010. Ekshärad is most famous for its historically rich church. Ekshärad is also well known for the unique Ekshäring dialect.

Notable people
Carl-Johan Bergman, biatholonist
David Ekholm, biathlete
Lennart Hall, professor of music
Bertil Jonasson, centerpartistisk riksdagsledamot
Lars Löfgren, head of TV-teatern and Kungliga Dramatiska Teatern
Gunnar Olsson, professor of Human Geography at Uppsala University
Sofie Skoog, high jumper

References 

Populated places in Värmland County
Populated places in Hagfors Municipality